Breceña (variant: San Pedru de Breceña) is one of 41 parishes (administrative divisions) in Villaviciosa, a municipality within the province and autonomous community of Asturias, in northern Spain.

Villages and hamlets
 Breceña
 Buslad
 Ceyanes
 Charcón
 Cueto
 La Infiesta Liñana
 Novales
 Pando
 Seli
 Soto
 Terrero
 Vallina

References

Parishes in Villaviciosa